The 2014 FC Atyrau season was the 14th successive season that the club playing in the Kazakhstan Premier League, the highest tier of association football in Kazakhstan. Atyrau finished the season in 9th position and reached the Quarter-finals of the Kazakhstan Cup, where they lost to Kairat.

Squad
As of 19 September 2014.

Out on loan

Transfers

Winter

In:

Out:

Summer

In:

Out:

Competitions

Kazakhstan Premier League

First round

Results summary

Results by round

Results

League table

Relegation Round

Results summary

Results by round

Results

Table

Kazakhstan Cup

Squad statistics

Appearances and goals

|-
|colspan="14"|Players away from Atyrau on loan:

|-
|colspan="14"|Players who appeared for Atyrau that left during the season:

|}

Goal scorers

Disciplinary record

References

External links
 Official Site

Atyrau
FC Atyrau seasons